Francisco Fernández de la Cueva may refer to:

 Francisco Fernández de la Cueva, 2nd Duke of Alburquerque  (1467 – 1526) 
 Francisco Fernández de la Cueva, 4th Duke of Alburquerque  (1510 - 1563)
 Francisco Fernández de la Cueva, 7th Duke of Alburquerque  (1575 – 1637)
 Francisco Fernández de la Cueva, 8th Duke of Alburquerque  (1619 - 1676)
 Francisco Fernández de la Cueva, 10th Duke of Alburquerque (1666 – 1724) 
 Francisco Fernández de la Cueva, 11th Duke of Alburquerque (1692 - 1757)